Global Startup Battle was launched by Startup Weekend in 2011 during Global Entrepreneurship Week. The 2012 battle included 10,000+ participants, 1,200+ teams, taking place in 100+ cities around the world. Global Startup Battle has three phases: First, the team must win the local Startup Weekend. Second, the team must win a Facebook popularity contest by receive votes. Only the top 15 teams move on to the final stage. The final stage is a judging panel.

The 2013 saw the competition grow to 2,300+ teams from 167 cities in 40 counties around the globe. GSB 2013 saw the introduction of 'Circles'; The Champions Circle (entrants had to one of the top 2 teams from their Startup Weekend to enter this Circle), E-Commerce, Innovators, Activate and Women's Circle.

Global Startup Battle 2013

Global Startup Battle 2012

On December 5, 2012, it was announced that Groupnotes, now operating as RouteThis, were the winners with SmartWard and Beethoven coming in second and third, respectively.

See also
Global Entrepreneurship Week
Startup Weekend

References

Entrepreneurship organizations
November observances